West African jihads may refer to:
Fula jihads, the 18th- and 19th-century Islamic movements that led the founding of various Fula states
Insurgency in the Maghreb (2002–present), the ongoing jihadist conflict in the Sahel
Boko Haram insurgency, the ongoing insurgency in Nigeria